Arts of Life, based in Chicago, is a 501(c)3 nonprofit organization that provides studio space, supplies, professional development support, and exhibition opportunities to artists with intellectual and developmental disabilities. At the time of its founding in 2000, Arts of Life was the first program in Chicago to provide employment in the arts for adults with developmental disabilities. It has two studio and gallery locations that are each 6,000 square feet. The Chicago studio is located at 2010 West Carroll Avenue, in Chicago, Illinois and the North Shore studio is located at 1963 Johns Drive in Glenview, Illinois. The studio's artists work in various media, including painting, drawing, fibers, sculpture, music, and performance. As of 2021, the studio supports and provides services for over 60 artists.

About

As a progressive art studio, Arts of Life is an alternative day habilitation program, a support service model for individuals with developmental disabilities that provides training from staff in various occupational and daily living skills. Volunteers and staff  facilitate the artists and offer instruction in art techniques and professional development. It was co-founded by Denise Fisher, the manager of a residential program for people with disabilities, and Veronica "Ronnie" Cuculich, a resident in the program, as an alternative to limited job roles offered in sheltered workshops. As an organization, Arts of Life states that its focus is on inspiring artistic expression, helping artists build community, and promoting self-respect. Arts of Life artists and staff engage in collective decision-making on various aspects of the program including programming and the hiring of staff. The studio also assists artists in exhibiting and marketing their work.

Circle Contemporary

The affiliated gallery space for both studios, Circle Contemporary, was founded in 2017. It is the only Chicago gallery dedicated to exhibiting the work of artists both with and without intellectual and developmental disabilities. Exhibitions are co-curated by guest curators from the wider arts community and curators from Arts of Life.

Notable Exhibitions and Collaborations

Works by artists from Arts of Life have been featured in galleries, museums, businesses, and government offices around the city of Chicago and the United States, at locations including the Heaven Gallery, LVL3, Ukrainian Institute of Modern Art, Andrew Edlin Gallery, The Chicago Cultural Center, and the Chicago city clerk's office.
The 2017 exhibition at the Ukrainian Institute of Modern Art, A is for Artist, curated by Scott Hunter, challenged "the idea of using the label 'outsider art' when describing artists who not only lack academic training in art, but who also suffer from  neurodevelopmental and neuropsychiatric disabilities."
In November and December 2020, work by artists from Arts of Life was projected on the Merchandise Mart building in downtown Chicago as part of the "Art on theMART" video art display.
In 2020, Arts of Life artists contributed sculpture designs to Ducks on the Mag Mile, a public art project in conjunction with the annual fundraising event for Special Olympics Illinois.
In 2020, a collaboration between Arts of Life artist David Krueger and another Chicago artist, Ben Marcus, was released as Love Man: Forever and Ever Again by the publisher Perfectly Acceptable.

Studio Bands

The Arts of Life Band is a collaboration that features performers with and without disabilities. The band has released albums containing original songs and was included on a compilation album of music by bands with members who have disabilities, Wild Things, released by British punk group Heavy Load in 2009. Similarly, artists at the North Shore studio and musicians without disabilities perform together as the band Van Go Go.

Funding

Arts of Life receives funding from the state of Illinois, individual donors, grants, and foundations. The organization has partnerships with sponsoring businesses, professional artists, service providers, and brands, including the MacArthur Foundation, the National Endowment for the Arts, the Illinois Arts Council, the Arts and Business Council of Chicago, the Chicago Community Trust, and the West Town Chamber of Commerce. It also holds a variety of group shows and benefits.

References

External links 
Arts of Life website

501(c)(3) organizations
Arts organizations based in Illinois
Non-profit organizations based in Chicago
Disability organizations
Intellectual disability organizations
Chicago